Elaine Hoffman Watts (May 25, 1932 – September 25, 2017) was a klezmer drummer from Philadelphia, Pennsylvania, United States.

Biography
Watts came from a line of klezmer musicians from what is now Ukraine and was the daughter of Jacob Hoffman, a klezmer xylophone player and bandleader from the 1920s who also played with the Philadelphia Orchestra and Ballets Russes Orchestra. Her daughter Susan Watts is a klezmer trumpet player and an important figure in the klezmer revival.

In 1954, Elaine Hoffman Watts was the first woman percussionist to be accepted and graduate from the Curtis Institute of Music in Philadelphia.

Beginning in 1998, she was a percussion teacher at KlezKamp, and she taught percussion in the Philadelphia area beginning in the mid-1960s. She was a recipient of a 2007 National Heritage Fellowship awarded by the National Endowment for the Arts, which is the United States' highest honor in the folk and traditional arts.

References

External links
 Klezmershack review and brief biography of Watts
 Philly Klezmer site timeline of notable events in Watts' life

1932 births
2017 deaths
Musicians from Philadelphia
Curtis Institute of Music alumni
American women drummers
20th-century American drummers
Klezmer musicians
Jewish women musicians
National Heritage Fellowship winners